Virtue Party was a political party in Turkey.

Virtue Party may also refer to:

El Vadila, a political party in Mauritania
Islamic Virtue Party, a political party in Iraq
Virtue Party (Azerbaijan), a political party in Azerbaijan
Virtue Party (Egypt), a political party in Egypt